Tijana Petković (born August 15, 1986), née Tijana Arnautović, is Bosnian Canadian beauty pageant contestant and model who won the title of Miss Canada in 2004 and represented her country in Miss World 2004.

Early life
Arnautović was born in the small town of Konjic in SR Bosnia and Herzegovina, SFR Yugoslavia, where the family lived until the Bosnian War. In 1992, her family fled Konjic, which was controlled by the Army of the Republic of Bosnia and Herzegovina, to the part of the country controlled by the Army of Republika Srpska. Later, the family moved to Canada via Federal Republic of Yugoslavia, initially to Sherbrooke, before settling in Ottawa, Ontario.

Miss Canada
In 2004, then a Carleton University student, Arnautović was named Miss World Canada.

Professional engagement 
Tijana worked as Business Development Manager for Ominiglobe Business Solutions and most recently she was welcomed to a new role with German international company TITUS where she is employed as German Account Executive.

Community work
Once moved to Canada Tiјana was active in the local Serbian community as a volunteer. After she was crowned as Miss Canada in 2004 Tiјana dedicated her time to promote youth leadership and community engagement. Tiјana founded and led The International Diaspora Youth Leadership Conference from 2009 to 2011.

References

External links
 
 Miss World 2004 - Getty images
 
 
 Tiana and Lionel Richie
 Tijana on Perfect People

1986 births
Living people
People from Konjic
Serbs of Bosnia and Herzegovina
Bosnia and Herzegovina emigrants to Canada
Bosnia and Herzegovina refugees
Miss World 2004 delegates
Miss World Canada winners
Naturalized citizens of Canada
People from Ottawa
Canadian people of Serbian descent
Yugoslav Wars refugees